Arreskov Lake is a lake in Funen.

See also
List of lakes in Denmark

References

Geography of Funen
Lakes of Denmark